Abeleh may refer to:
 Ableh (disambiguation)